The 1977 Japan Series was the 28th edition of Nippon Professional Baseball's postseason championship series. It matched the Central League champion Yomiuri Giants against the Pacific League champion Hankyu Braves. This was a rematch of the previous year's Japan Series, which the Braves won in seven games. The Braves would again defeat the Giants, this time in five games, to capture their third consecutive championship.

Summary

See also
1977 World Series

References

Japan Series
Orix Buffaloes
Yomiuri Giants
Japan Series
Japan Series
Japan Series
Japan Series